Anthedonella is a genus of moths in the family Sesiidae.

Species
Anthedonella flavida Gorbunov & Arita, 2000
Anthedonella ignicauda (Hampson, 1919)
Anthedonella jinghongensis (Yang & Wang, 1989)
Anthedonella opalizans (Hampson, 1919)
Anthedonella polyphaga Gorbunov & Arita, 1999
Anthedonella subtillima (Bryk, 1947)
Anthedonella theobroma (Bradley, 1957)

References

Sesiidae